The 1985 Soviet First League (Chempionat SSSR 1985 goda v pervoi lige) was a fifteenth season of the Soviet First League.

First stage

Group West

Group East

Second stage

Group A

Group B

Transitional tournaments

Higher League Promotion
Promotion tournament took place in Moscow on 27 November — 15 December 1985.

Second League Relegation

Group A

Group B

Group V

Top scorers

Number of teams by union republic

See also
 Soviet First League

External links
 1985. First League. (1985. Первая лига.) Luhansk Nash Futbol.

Soviet First League seasons
2
Soviet
Soviet